Ella Gombaszögi (born Erzsébet Grün; 27 December 1894 – 12 November 1951) was a Hungarian actress.

Selected filmography 

 Vorrei morir (1918)
 The New Relative (1934)
 Everything for the Woman (1934)
 The Dream Car (1934)
 A Night in Venice (1934)
 Romance of Ida (1934)
 Emmy (1934)
 Szent Péter esernyöje (1935)
 Pókháló (1936)
 Janika (1949)
 Déryné (1951)

External links 

1894 births
1951 deaths
Hungarian film actresses
Hungarian silent film actresses
Actresses from Budapest